Mikko Kärnä (born 8 December 1980 in Espoo) is a Finnish politician. He served as a member of the Parliament of Finland from 30 April 2015 until 12 June 2018 for the Lapland constituency. He was also the mayor of Enontekiö from 2012 to 2015. He is a member of the Centre Party.

In April 2019 he was reelected as a member of the Parliament of Finland.

References

1980 births
Living people
People from Espoo
Centre Party (Finland) politicians
Members of the Parliament of Finland (2015–19)
Members of the Parliament of Finland (2019–23)
Mayors of places in Finland